Iglino (İglin) is a rural locality (a selo) and the administrative center of Iglinsky District in Bashkortostan, Russia. Population:

References

Notes

Sources

Rural localities in Iglinsky District
Ufa Governorate